Aditya College, was established in 2007 and is in the historic city of Gwalior, Madhya Pradesh.

The College is affiliated with Jiwaji University, Gwalior and has four academic departments: Commerce, Management, Computer Science and Tourism.

Academic programmes
Aditya College offers following undergraduate programmes
 Bachelor of Commerce (B.Com)
 Bachelor of Business Administration (BBA)
 Bachelor of Computer Application (BCA)
 Bachelor of Tourism Management (BTM)

Affiliations and accreditation

 Affiliated to Jiwaji University, Gwalior
 Recognized by M.P. Higher Education, Bhopal
 Approved by University Grant Commission (UGC), Delhi

Professional Certifications with Degree

 Retail Management
 Entrepreneurship Development
 Stocks & Shares
 Electronic Commerce
 Business Research
 Financial Studies
 Tally Training
 Photography
 Rural Tourism
 Hospitality Management 
 Basic Computing
 Office Computing
 Website Development
 Project Development
 Networking and Hardware Essentials
 Leadership Development Programmes
 Communications & Presentation Skills

Global Immersion Programme
Global Immersion Programme is offered to give an opportunity to gain overseas exposure academically, culturally and socially. The objectives of the programme are to provide an understanding of the region's business, cultural and political environments, achieve a working knowledge of regional business practice, and promote intercultural awareness and communication skills.

iPad programme
The College leases an iPad to every freshman. When the students graduate, the College transfers ownership of the iPad to them.

Personality Development Programmes
The Personality Development Programmes aim to develop the organized pattern of behaviors and attitudes amongst its students that makes them distinctive & reflective. The objective is to screen out barriers or obstructions that stand in the way of the expression of individual personality and to develop soft skills as they involves attributes related to optimism, common sense, responsibility, sense of humor, integrity, time-management, motivation, etc. Teaching pedagogies include simulation exercises, role play, group discussion, presentations, management games, research projects, live projects, etc.

References

External links
 
 

Commerce colleges in India
Universities and colleges in Gwalior
Educational institutions established in 2007
2007 establishments in Madhya Pradesh